Darevskia caucasica is a lizard species in the genus Darevskia. It is found in Russia, Georgia and Azerbaijan.

References

Darevskia
Reptiles described in 1909
Taxa named by Lajos Méhelÿ
Reptiles of Russia